The discography of Zhao Wei, a Chinese actress and pop singer, contains seven studio albums, forty-five music videos, and a number of other appearances.

In 1999, Zhao also entered the music industry and released her first album, Swallow. It included several tunes from the series My Fair Princess. The album was relatively successful and received several awards; critics commented on Zhao's potential in the music industry. In 1999, China's Pop Songs Chart Committee presented Zhao the "Best Potential Award" for her debut album. The same year, Radio Hong Kong awarded Zhao the "Best Progress Award." Moreover, Radio Hong Kong presented Zhao an "Outstanding Mandarin Song Bronze Award" for her single "There is a Girl" (有一个姑娘). Originally, "There is a Girl" was a theme in Zhao's breakthrough series, My Fair Princess.

Following Zhao's debut in the music industry, she has released several other albums. Also in 1999, following Swallow, Magic of Love was released. In 2001, Zhao released the album The Last Separation, based on her recent breakup with her boyfriend. Zhao's first three albums sold well in China, selling over 3 million copies, but received a lukewarm response from critics. As part of the soundtrack for Romance in the Rain, Zhao performed several songs written by Chiung Yao. In the actual television series, Zhao's character, Lu Yiping, also performed many songs.

After taking a three-year break from singing to focus on her acting work, in 2004 Zhao released the album Piao (飄), meaning "flutter." Zhao recorded this album in hopes of coping with the rumours about her. Fans and critics alike feel Zhao's new album shows a more mature and expressive singing technique. Included in the album were hits such as "Jian Jian" and "Continuous Rainy Sunday." Following the release of Piao, Zhao's music career flourished. At the 12th East Music Awards, Zhao won the Best Stage Performance Award. Furthermore, at the 5th Pepsi Music Chart Awards, Zhao was selected as Mainland's Most Popular Female Singer.

Following the success of Piao, Zhao released another album titled Double (双). This album included the popular hits "One Tiny Part" (微小的部分)and "Shangguan Yan and I" (我和上官燕). It also included "Faxian" (发现; literally "Realize"), based on the theme song of Moment in Peking. The success of Double resulted in Zhao winning "Most Popular Female Artist" at the 13th ERS Golden Song Awards and Music Radio Awards.

Her music career is highlighted by her wins in the Channel V's 12th Chinese Music Billboard Event in 2006. Zhao won awards for Most Popular Female Artist and Most Popular Music Video for her music video "Shangguan Yan and I." Zhao was also awarded MTV Asia's Favourite Artist from Mainland China.

Her seventh album Angel's Suitcase was crowned the Best Female Vocal Performance and Best Album.

Singles

Albums

Studio albums

Compilations

Soundtracks

Other appearances
Besides studio albums and soundtracks, Zhao Wei sang a number of promo songs, TV shows or movie theme songs which didn't appear on any album or soundtracks.

Music videos

Awards and nominations

References

External links
Soundunwound
Zhao Wei International Net Family

Discographies of Chinese artists
Mandopop discographies